Antonia of Savoy (died 1500), was Lady of Monaco by marriage to Jean II, Lord of Monaco.     

Antonia or Antoinette of Savoy was the illegitimate daughter of Philip II, Duke of Savoy and his mistress Libera Portoneri.   She was raised in the household of the queen of France, Charlotte of Savoy.  In 1487, she was arranged to marry the heir to the throne of Monaco in a peace agreement between Monaco and Savoy supported by France.  The marriage was of high importance to Savoy, and part of a process in which was completed in 1489, when Savoy acknowledged the independence of Savoy.  

The couple had a daughter, Marie Grimaldi, wo was in 1515 married to Geronimo della Rovere and was forced to renounce her rights to the throne upon her marriage.

Further reading
 Michel-Yves Mourou, Princesses de Monaco, Editions du Rocher, Monaco, 2010.

References

1500 deaths
House of Savoy
Year of birth unknown
15th-century people from Savoy